The Albany Tulip Queen and Court is a symbolic monarchy with a yearly coronation at the Tulip Festival, which takes place in May at Washington Park in Albany, New York annually. The Tulip Queen and her court serve as ambassadors of the city and engage in community service projects during their one-year term.

The Tulip Queen is selected through a process involving letters of recommendation and interviews by a selection committee. Women aged 18 to 24 are eligible for nomination. The selection of the Tulip Queen began as a beauty pageant, but for many years now the Queen and her court have been selected solely based on their community awareness, history of serving the community, and dedication to Albany. Along with the queen, four court members are selected to work throughout the City of Albany during the year. Each year the Queen and her court select a literacy project to implement in the City of Albany.

The crowning of the Tulip Queen starts with a short processional.  First come the police, then the Albany Police Band playing bagpipes and drums, then a car containing last year's Tulip Queen and the current mayor.  Next come a series of five cars each containing the five Tulip Queen finalists. After the processional, the mayor, each finalist, and few other people give speeches.  The mayor reads a note that says who has won the Tulip Queen title.  Finally, last year's Tulip Queen takes off her crown and puts it on the head of the new queen. The four finalist not crowned then become the court members. The Tulip Queen and her court serve their year of service until the next Tulip Festival takes place and a new queen is crowned.

The Albany Tulip Queen and Court are an asset to the city of  Albany contributing thousands of hours each year in volunteer service.

List of Albany Tulip Queens

The first several decades of the tradition did not honor the court in the way that it currently is. The court began to participate in events year round in the 1980s.

Notes

External links
Albany Tulip Queen (official site)

American upper class
Culture of Albany, New York
High society (social class)